Andrea Barata Ribeiro is a Brazilian film producer. She is best known for producing the Academy Award-nominated 2002 film City of God.

She is a founding partner of O2 Filmes.

References 

Brazilian film producers
Brazilian women film producers
Living people
Year of birth missing (living people)